Springfield is a census-designated place (CDP) comprising the downtown area of Springfield Township, Union County, New Jersey, United States. It was first listed as a CDP prior to the 2020 census.

The CDP is bordered by Interstate 78 to the north, state route 577 and Meisel Avenue to the east, Cottage Lane to the south, Milltown Road, South Springfield Avenue, and Shunpike Road to the southwest, and Mountain Avenue, Caldwell Place, and Morris Avenue to the west. Morris Avenue is the main street through the downtown, leading southeast as New Jersey Route 82,  to Elizabeth, and northwest as Route 124,  to the Summit city limits.

Demographics

References 

Census-designated places in Union County, New Jersey
Census-designated places in New Jersey
Springfield Township, Union County, New Jersey